Temper Temper is the fourth studio album by Welsh heavy metal band Bullet for My Valentine. The album was released on 8 February 2013 in Australia, and 11 February 2013 worldwide under RCA Records, their first under the label. The album was once again produced by Don Gilmore, who worked on the group's last album, 2010's Fever, and was mixed by noted engineer Chris Lord-Alge. This would be the last album recorded with their full original lineup with longtime bassist Jason James before he departed from the band in February 2015.

The band debuted the album's title track live on 22 October 2012 as part of BBC Radio 1's Rock Week. Bullet for My Valentine released the track entitled "Temper Temper" on 30 October 2012 worldwide across all digital providers apart from in the UK where it was released on 25 November 2012. On 12 November a music video for the single "Temper Temper" was released. It was shot in Los Angeles and directed by Michael Dispenza. On 17 December 2012 the next single was released via YouTube named "Riot". On 11 January 2013 the music video for "Riot" was released. The band collaborated with Chris Jericho from Fozzy on the song "Dead to the World", in which Jericho co-wrote the lyrics. The album was leaked on 1 February 2013. Bullet for My Valentine released a music video for "P.O.W." on 24 May 2013, and another video for "Breaking Point" on 7 June 2013.

Reception

Critical

The album received mixed to negative reviews. Ultimate Guitar lamented that "even the brighter musical moments struggle to get off the ground. It's a real shame."  Similarly, Dom Lawson of The Guardian awarded Temper Temper two out of five stars, feeling the album "is marred by cynicism and a lack of dirt under its nails." BBC's Raziq Rauf gave the album a negative review, finishing with "The Welshmen need to improve on Temper Temper come their next long-player, or they risk lasting damage to a previously untouchable reputation."

Chad Childers of Loudwire gave the album a positive review, stating that "Bullet for My Valentine are clicking on all cylinders on their new album." ARTISTdirect gave the album five out of five stars, saying "Temper Temper expertly fuses the quartet's signature tight, technical thrash with the biggest hooks of their career."

Commercial

Temper Temper peaked at number 13 on the US Billboard 200, selling 41,000 copies the first week. It stayed for nine weeks on the chart. By 2018, it had sold over 340,000 copies in the United States.

Track listing

Personnel
Bullet for My Valentine
Matt Tuck – vocals, rhythm guitar; bass (uncredited)
Michael "Moose" Thomas – drums
Michael "Padge" Paget – lead guitar, backing vocals
Jay James – bass (credited but does not perform), backing vocals

Production
Don Gilmore – producer
Chris Lord-Alge – mixing 
Ted Jensen – mastering at Sterling Sound

Charts

References

Bullet for My Valentine albums
2013 albums
RCA Records albums